The Bayer designation A Serpentis is shared by two stars in the head of the constellation Serpens:
 A1 Serpentis (11 Serpentis)
 A2 Serpentis (25 Serpentis)

References

Serpentis, A
Serpens (constellation)